Possessed II (艷鬼發狂) is a 1984 Hong Kong film directed by David Lai.  It is preceded by Possessed in 1983.

Plot
A bar waitress lived with her boyfriend and gave birth to a baby boy called Paul. Seven years later, her boyfriend abandoned the family and never returned. Out of rage, the bar waitress committed suicide and killed Paul too. Thirty years later, new residents move in the house while knowing nothing about its history. When they get settled, strange things start to happen...

External links
 

Hong Kong horror films
1983 films
Films directed by David Lai
Hong Kong supernatural horror films
1980s Hong Kong films